George Browne (before 1794 – June 10, 1822) was a merchant and political figure in Lower Canada. He represented Gaspé in the Legislative Assembly of Lower Canada from 1814 to 1816.

He was a merchant and importer of goods based in Quebec City. Browne did not run for reelection in 1816. He died in Quebec City.

References 
 

Year of birth unknown
1822 deaths
Members of the Legislative Assembly of Lower Canada
Year of birth uncertain